The All I Ever Wanted Tour was the fifth headlining concert tour by American pop rock recoding artist Kelly Clarkson in support of her fourth studio album, All I Ever Wanted (2009). It began on October 2, 2009, in Uncasville, Connecticut and finished on May 8, 2010, in Macau. The tour visited North America, Europe, Africa, Oceania, and Asia.

Background
The tour was announced in July 2009, in the middle of Clarkson's summer fair tour. The Auckland show was announced in November 2009. This tour marked the first time Clarkson toured Africa, Asia, and New Zealand.

Show synopsis
Clarkson began and ended each show with "All I Ever Wanted" and "My Life Would Suck Without You". The setlist was filled with past hits, tracks from her fourth album, All I Ever Wanted, and covers. One of the covers was a mashup of Alanis Morissette's "That I Would Be Good" and Kings of Leon's "Use Somebody". The setlist was changed-up a bit starting with the Oceania shows. Clarkson was backed by her twelve piece band.

Critical reception
MTV's Jim Cantiello was at the New York City show and said, "Kelly Clarkson brings everyone together: the young, the old, the gay, the straight, the hipsters, the teenyboppers, the Glamberts, the Allen Nation." He also praised her vocal talent saying, "which she used to great effect in her expansive set." Gene Stout attended the Seattle show and said, "the former "American Idol" proved indispensable in keeping me and thousands of her fans entertained with an onslaught of such past hits" and that she 
"performed with a surprisingly effective blend of polish and grit." Keith Fairbank of South Wales Argus, said of the Cardiff show, "There's a live band and some strobe lights – but that's it. No elaborate staging, no flying from wires, no dancers. Not even a costume change. Kelly lets her music rule the show and gave the crowd all they ever wanted." He also said that her voice was "fantastic." Tracey Bond of Stuff who attended the Auckland show said, "From the moment Clarkson skipped out on stage, barefoot, to the opening bars of All I Ever Wanted, she gave the crowd at Vector 110 percent. On every song she demonstrated the powerful voice which helped her to win the first season of American Idol."

Opening acts
Parachute 
Jason Hartman 
Eric Hutchinson 
Some & Any 
Cassie Davis 
Suki Low –  
Jaclyn Victor – 
Miguel Escueta – 
RubberBand

Setlist
{{hidden
| headercss = background: #ff6929; font-size: 100%; width: 59%;
| contentcss = text-align: left; font-size: 100%; width: 75%;
| header = Set I
| content = ;October 2, 2009 – March 17, 2010
"All I Ever Wanted"
"Miss Independent"
"I Do Not Hook Up"
"Impossible"
Mash up: "That I Would Be Good" / "Use Somebody" 
"Breakaway"
"If I Can't Have You"
"Never Again"
"Lies" 
"Walkin' After Midnight"
"Behind These Hazel Eyes"
"Cry"
"I Want You"
"Rock with You" 
"Ready"
"Because of You"
"Walk Away"
"Since U Been Gone"
"Already Gone"
Encore
"Sober"
"7 Nation Army" 
"My Life Would Suck Without You"

}}
{{hidden
| headercss = background: #ff6929; font-size: 100%; width: 59%;
| contentcss = text-align: left; font-size: 100%; width: 75%;
| header = Set II
| content = ;April 11, 2010 – May 8, 2010
"All I Ever Wanted"
"Miss Independent"
"I Do Not Hook Up"
"Impossible"
"Mashup: That I Would Be Good" / "Use Somebody" 
"Breakaway"
"If I Can't Have You (contains excerpts from "Can't Get You Out of My Head")
"Never Again"
"Lies" 
"Medley: "Just Missed the Train" / "Low" / "Addicted" / "Gone"
"Behind These Hazel Eyes"
"Cry"
"Save You"
"I Want You"
"Don't Let Me Stop You"
"Because of You"
"Walk Away"
"Since U Been Gone"
"Already Gone"
Encore
"Seven Nation Army" 
"My Life Would Suck Without You"

}}

Tour dates

Festivals and other miscellaneous performances
This concert was a part of the "Arizona State Fair"

Cancelled show
November 22, 2009: Kelowna, Canada – Prospera Place

Box office score data

Personnel
Band
Kelly Clarkson – Lead vocals
Justin Carpenter – Trombone
Cory Churko – Guitar, violin, backup vocals
Aben Eubanks – Guitar
Chris Gregg – Saxophone 
Jason Halbert– Keyboards, musical director
Miles McPherson – Drums
Einar Pedersen – Bass, backup vocals
Jill Pickering – Backup vocalist, guitar
Kate Rapier – Backup vocalist
Ric Robbins – DJ
Leif Shires – Trumpet

Other
Narvel Blackstock & Starstuck Management – Management
Brian Butner & NPB Companies, Inc. – Security
CAA – Booking
Ashley Donovan – Hair & makeup
Tricia Farrow – Production assistant
Flood, Bumstead, McCreedy & McCarthy Inc. – Business Management
Alan Hornall – Production manager
Janco Ltd. – Trucking 
Tim Krieg – Tour manager
Tait Towers – Staging/Set
Preferred Travel – Travel agency 
Rockit Cargo – Freight
Jeff Wuerth – Monitor tech

Controversy 
The tour faced controversy in 2010 when Clarkson's image was used to promote Indonesian cigarette brand L.A. Lights. The ad promoted the local government to protest and ban the singer's concert in Jakarta. After legal deliberation, the company removed Clarkson's likeness in the ads and stepped down as the concert's sponsor. The concert continued as planned.

External links
Kelly Clarkson Official Website

References

2009 concert tours
2010 concert tours
Kelly Clarkson concert tours